Habenaria repens, commonly called the water-spider bog orchid or the floating orchid, is an orchid species widespread across Latin America from Mexico and the West Indies south to Argentina, as well as in the Southeastern United States from Texas and Oklahoma east to Florida and the Carolinas plus an isolated population in Virginia.

A phenolic compound called habenariol can be found in H. repens. It acts as a feeding deterrent.

Varieties
Two taxonomic varieties are accepted as of June 2014:

Habenaria repens var. maxillaris (Lindl.) Garay - Guatemala, Colombia, Ecuador, Peru, Bolivia
Habenaria repens var. repens - most of species range including those regions listed for var. maxillaris

References

External links 
 
 
 Aquatic and Invasive Plant Identification Series by the UF/IFAS at www.youtube.com
 plants.usda.gov
 plants.ifas.ufl.edu 
 www.efloras.org

repens
Orchids of North America
Orchids of South America
Orchids of Central America
Orchids of Belize
Flora of Mexico
Flora of the Caribbean
Flora of Central America
Flora of the Southeastern United States
Plants described in 1818
Flora without expected TNC conservation status